Animal spirits is a term used by John Maynard Keynes in his 1936 book The General Theory of Employment, Interest and Money to describe the instincts, proclivities and emotions that ostensibly influence and guide human behavior, and which can be measured in terms of, for example, consumer confidence.

Use by Keynes

The original passage by Keynes reads:

Earlier uses

Philosophy and social science 
The notion of animal spirits has been described by René Descartes, Isaac Newton, and other scientists as how the notion of the vitality of the body is used.

In one of his letters about light, Newton wrote that animated spirits very easily live in "the brain, nerves, and muscles, which may become a convenient vessel to hold such a subtile spirit." These spirits, as described by Newton, are animated spirits of an ethereal nature, relating to life in the body. Later, it became a concept that acquired a psychological content but was always thought of in connection with the life processes of the body. Therefore, they retained a lower overall animal status.

William Safire explored the origins of the phrase in his 2009 article "On Language: 'Animal Spirits'":

 			
Thomas Hobbes used the phrase "animal spirits" to refer to passive emotions and instincts, as well as natural functions like breathing.

Ralph Waldo Emerson in Society and Solitude (1870) wrote of "animal spirits" as prompting people to action, in a broader sense than Keynes's:

In social science, Karl Marx refers to "animal spirits" in the 1887 English translation of Capital, Volume 1. Marx speaks of the animal spirits of the workers, which he believes a capitalist can either impel by encouraging social interaction and competition within their factory or depress by adopting assembly-line work whereby the worker repeats a single task.

Earlier and contemporaneous English use 

"Animal spirits" was a euphemistic late-Victorian and Edwardian phrase used by English public school boys such as P. G. Wodehouse (born two years before the Etonian Keynes) who attended Dulwich College. Wodehouse and Arthur Conan Doyle were popular authors for public school boys in England before the Great War. Doyle himself used the phrase "animal spirits" in 1883, the year of Keynes's birth.

Two examples of Wodehouse's use of the phrase are in the 1909 book Mike (later republished in two parts as Mike at Wrykyn and Mike and Psmith). "Animal spirits" denoted an adolescent attitude to authority that resulted in energetically and deliberately acting on advice, opinion, or exhortation to the point of stretching the letter of any regulations involved to the limit. The aim was to maximize short-term disruption of what was considered to be 'normal' behavior. Restoring equilibrium subsequently required a firm sanction from those in authority and possibly also a re-casting of the regulation to prevent repeats of the actions undertaken. The slang term of the era for this was 'ragging'. 

Wodehouse uses antithesis in the latter example to make comedy out of Mr. Downing's astonishment; surely nobody could be less susceptible to "animal spirits" than the suave, debonaire Psmith? Psmith In The City  (1910) was based on Wodehouse's own experiences in the 'square mile' and the theme is implicitly elaborated on in the financial environment of the New Asiatic Bank.

John Coates of Cambridge University supports the popular English Edwardian public school intuition that qualities such as dynamism and leadership coexist with less constructive traits such as recklessness, heedlessness, and in-caution. Coates attributes this to fluctuations in hormonal balances; abnormally high levels of testosterone may create individual success but also collective excessive aggression, overconfidence, and herd behavior, while too much cortisol can promote irrational pessimism and risk aversion. The author's remedy for this is to shift the employment balance in finance towards women and older men and monitor traders' biology.

Contemporary research 
Recent research shows that the term 'animal spirits' was used in the works of a psychologist that Keynes had studied in 1905 and also suggests that Keynes implicitly drew upon an evolutionary understanding of human instinct.

In 2009, economists George Akerlof and Robert J. Shiller advised in addition that:

Shiller further contends that 'animal spirits' refers also to the sense of trust humans have in each other, including a sense of fairness in economic dealings.

See also
 Behavioral economics
 Decision making
 Drive theory

Notes

External links 

 "Animal spirits" from The Economist'''s economic terms
 "A special report on the future of finance: Wild-animal spirits", The Economist, 22 January 2009
 "Animal Spirits Depend on Trust: The proposed stimulus isn't big enough to restore confidence" by Robert J. Shiller, The Wall Street Journal, 27 January 2009
 Loewenstein, George and  Ted O'Donoghue. "Animal Spirits: Affective and Deliberative Processes in Economic Behavior", Cornell University Working Paper 04-14, August 2004
 In 2013, NPR's Planet Money'' produced a video series and web site following the making of a tee shirt that they designed, featuring a visual pun on Keynes' animal spirits.

Economics catchphrases
Human behavior
Keynesian economics